The Museum of Free Derry is a museum located in Derry, Northern Ireland that focuses on the 1960s civil rights era known as The Troubles and the Free Derry Irish nationalist movement in the early 1970s.  Located in the Bogside district, the museum's exhibits include photographs, posters, film footage, letters and personal artifacts.

References

External links
Museum of Free Derry

History museums in Northern Ireland
Museums in County Londonderry
Buildings and structures in Derry (city)
Tourist attractions in Derry (city)